Brachodidae is a family of day-flying moths, commonly known as little bear moths, which contains about 135 species distributed around much of the world (Edwards et al. 1999). The relationships and status of the presently included genera are not well understood.

Genera
Subfamily Brachodinae Agenjo, 1966
Atractoceros Meyrick, 1936
Brachodes
Euthorybeta
Miscera
Saccocera Kallies, 2013
Synechodes
Subfamily Phycodinae Rebel, 1907
Nigilgia
Paranigilgia Kallies, 1998
Phycodes (syn: Tegna)
Phycodopteryx Kallies, 2004
Unknown
Hoplophractis
Sagalassa
Sisyroctenis

Formerly placed here
Pseudocossus

References
 
 , 1998 : A contribution to the knowledge of the Oriental and Australian Brachodidae (Lepidoptera, Sesioidea). Tinea 15(4): 312-337.
 , 2002: Brachodes flagellatus sp. n. from Tibet (Lepidoptera: Sesioidea, Brachodidae). Nachrichten des Entomologische Vereins Apollo NF 23 (3): 159–160.
 
 
Pitkin, B. & P. Jenkins. Butterflies and Moths of the World: Generic Names and their Type-species. Natural History Museum.
 , 1999: New and little known moth species (Lepidoptera: Thyrididae, Brachodidae) in the fauna of Russia and neighboring territories. Entomological Review 79 (6): 679-690. Abstract: .
 , 2009: A new Brachodes moth from Hainan Island, China (Lepidoptera: Brachodidae). Lepidoptera Novae (Gainesville) 2(2): 121-124.

External links
Natural History Museum Lepidoptera genus database
Tree of Life

 
Moth families